Madhuca monticola is a tree in the family Sapotaceae. The twigs are greyish. Inflorescences bear up to eight flowers. The specific epithet  is from the Latin meaning "mountain dweller", referring to the habitat. M. monticola is found in Borneo and the Philippines.

References

monticola
Trees of Borneo
Trees of the Philippines
Plants described in 1915